Jaroslav Makohin (born 6 June 1976) is a Czech diver. He competed in the men's 3 metre springboard event at the 2000 Summer Olympics.

References

1976 births
Living people
Czech male divers
Olympic divers of the Czech Republic
Divers at the 2000 Summer Olympics
People from Rava-Ruska